is a train station on the Kintetsu Keihanna Line in Ikoma, Nara Prefecture, Japan.

Line
Kintetsu Keihanna Line (Station Number: C29)

Layout
The station has two side platforms elevated serving a track each.

Surroundings
Nara Kotsu Kita-Yamato Office
Kansai Science City Takayama Region
Nara Institute of Science and Technology
Osaka Prefectural Route 7 and Nara Prefectural Route 7 Hirakata-Yamatokoriyama Route

History
March 27, 2006: Station begins services as the Keihanna Line extension between Ikoma and Gakken Nara-Tomigaoka opens.

Stations next to Gakken Kita-Ikoma

	

Railway stations in Japan opened in 2006
Railway stations in Nara Prefecture
Stations of Kintetsu Railway